The Hawk of Wild River is a 1952 American Western film directed by Fred F. Sears and written by Howard J. Green. The film stars Charles Starrett, Smiley Burnette, Jock Mahoney, Clayton Moore, Eddie Parker and Jim Diehl. The film was released on February 28, 1952, by Columbia Pictures.

Plot
Undercover Ranger Steve Martin comes to town to nab a half Indian outlaw known as the Hawk. Martin is able to infiltrate the Hawk's gang. Meanwhile travelling photographer Smiley Burnette is hypnotised by a dubious dentist into believing he is an Indian Chief leading him to out shoot the Hawk with a longbow.

Cast          
Charles Starrett as Steve Martin / The Durango Kid
Smiley Burnette as Smiley Burnette 
Jock Mahoney as Jack Mahoney 
Clayton Moore as The Hawk
Eddie Parker as Skeeter 
Jim Diehl as Al Travis
Lane Chandler as George
Syd Saylor as Yank-Em-Out Kennedy
John Cason as Duke
LeRoy Johnson as Smoky
Jack Carry as Pete
Sam Flint as Clark Mahoney
Raider as Raider 
Bullet as Bullet

References

External links
 

1952 films
American black-and-white films
American Western (genre) films
1952 Western (genre) films
Columbia Pictures films
Films directed by Fred F. Sears
1950s English-language films
1950s American films